Events in the year 1990 in Bulgaria.

Incumbents 

 President: Petar Mladenov (from 1989 until February 2) Zhelyu Zhelev (from August 1 until 1997)
 Prime Minister: Georgi Atanasov (from 1986 until February 3) Andrey Lukanov (from February 3 until December 7) Dimitar Popov (from December 7 until 1991)

Events 

 10 June – Constitutional Assembly elections were held in Bulgaria.

References 

 
1990s in Bulgaria
Years of the 20th century in Bulgaria
Bulgaria
Bulgaria